Högalid Church is a protected church located in the Södermalm district of Stockholm, Sweden. It was designed by architect Ivar Tengbom. Built upon elevated ground 1916–1923, in a barren area later turned into a park, it is one of the most prominent buildings in the city, complementing the contemporary Stockholm City Hall on the opposite side of Riddarfjärden. The church is considered one of Sweden's foremost examples of the National Romantic architectural style.

See also
 List of churches in Stockholm

References

External links 

 

20th-century Church of Sweden church buildings
Art Nouveau architecture in Stockholm
Churches in Stockholm
Churches completed in 1923
National Romantic architecture in Sweden
Churches in the Diocese of Stockholm (Church of Sweden)
1923 establishments in Sweden